The 2015 Ronde van Drenthe World Cup was the 9th running of the Ronde van Drenthe World Cup, a women's bicycle race in the Netherlands. The race was won by Jolien D'Hoore in a sprint finish, ahead of Amy Pieters and Ellen van Dijk.

Results

Race result

World Cup standings

See also
2015 in women's road cycling

References

External links
  

Ronde van Drenthe (women's race)
Ronde van Drenthe World Cup
Ronde van Drenthe